Ali Hoseyn may refer to:

Ali Hoseyn, Khuzestan
Ali Hoseyn, Lorestan
Ali Hoseyn, alternate name of Salanjeh Zaruni, Lorestan

See also
 Ali Hoseyni